Parliamentary elections were held in Guatemala on 16 December 1959, in order to elect half the seats in Congress. Voter turnout was just 44.91%.

Results

References

Bibliography
Villagrán Kramer. Francisco. Biografía política de Guatemala: años de guerra y años de paz. FLACSO-Guatemala. 2004. 
Political handbook of the world 1959. New York. 1960. 

Elections in Guatemala
Guatemala
1959 in Guatemala
Election and referendum articles with incomplete results